Goner is a village of over 12,000 inhabitants in India.

Geography 

The Dravyavati River passes through Goner.

Demographics 
 the population was 6,049. The literacy rate was 77% and the sex ratio was 899 female per 1000 male.

Administration 
Tehsil level local administration is conducted at the headquarters at Sanganer, subdivision of Jaipur district.

the gram panchayat level local administration is conducted as Goner and current representative or sarpanch is Mrs.Meena Patwa w/o Mr.kailash)

The village falls within Bagru assembly constituency of the Rajasthan Legislative Assembly. The current representative is Ganga Devi.

The Lok Sabha constituency is Jaipur, and the current MP is Ramcharan Bohara.

References 

Villages in Jaipur district
Villages in Sanganer Tehsil